Boneh-ye Naimeh (also Romanized as Boneh-ye Naʿīmeh) is a village in Howmeh-ye Gharbi Rural District, in the Central District of Ramhormoz County, Khuzestan Province, Iran. At the 2006 census, its population was 183, in 36 families.

References 

Populated places in Ramhormoz County